Lady Marian is a character portrayed by Lucy Griffiths in the BBC television serial Robin Hood. She is the daughter of the former Sheriff of Nottingham.

Description 
Marian is 21 years old, and in contrast to most Robin Hood legends, is not described as Maid Marian, but rather Lady Marian. This is because "In those days [21] would be considered quite old to still be a maid," according to actress Lucy Griffiths. Griffiths was 18 during auditions for the role and 19 during filming.

Marian is beautiful and carries some status with her, as the daughter of Edward, the old Sheriff.

Marian is characterized as headstrong and no-nonsense, if often derisive of Robin's arrogance and cocky attitude towards her. But despite this, her love for him is evident as the series progresses, and they share many tender moments in secret.

Story

First series 
She was engaged to Robin Hood before he went to fight in the crusades but is visibly cold and aloof toward him on his return. In episode 12 she later admits that she considered him a hero even while calling him a fool. She is initially disapproving of Robin's outlaw status because she believes he best way to fight injustice is to work inside the system. However, she aids him in his fight against the Sheriff by frequently spying for him and giving him inside information that she has picked up in the Sheriff's castle, and from Guy of Gisborne. Marian also fights the Sheriff in her own right, disguising herself as the Night Watchman and giving the poor food and supplies.

Gisborne, a dispossessed lord and Vaisey's right-hand man, falls in love with Marian. She resists his attentions and gifts, unable to look past his murderous ways and cruelty. But as time goes on, Guy realizes that beyond her status and beauty, he wonders if her pure heart and empathy could end his compulsive evil and bring about his redemption upon marriage. She is coerced by Guy into agreeing to marry him when King Richard returns to England. Though she does not love him, she does agrees to the union to protect both herself and her father from his wrath.

When King Richard appears to return to England (but is, in fact, an impostor), Marian must fulfill her promise to marry Guy, and he immediately prepares their wedding. In one final act of defiance against him, she dresses as the Night Watchman and attempts to steal from him, but he stabs her as she makes her escape, unaware that she is Marian. Djaq nurses her and manages to revive her when she goes into cardiac arrest. Soon after though, Marian apparently dies, and the penultimate episode of the first series ends with Robin mourning over her body and confessing his love for her. It is revealed in the following episode that her body merely shut down as a result of a concoction that she had been given by Guy's physician Pitts.

Regaining her health shortly afterwards, Marian arrives to marry Guy. The wedding is interrupted by a frantic Much, who informs her that the King is an impostor, and that it is a ruse by the Sheriff, and Guy to weed out the Sheriff's enemies. In the hope that she will forgive him, Guy admits that he knew of the plan, but Marian punches him and flees the wedding. Robin rides up on horseback to greet her and Much, and Marian rides off with him. When they arrive at the castle to expose the Sheriff's plot, she and Robin kiss.

Second series 
In the second series, Marian and her father are under house arrest in Nottingham Castle. Marian cannot travel out of the castle without an armed guard, although she manages to avoid one due to Robin's men creating a diversion, or her being allowed a day off by Guy. With these methods of avoiding an armed chaperon, Marian manages to successfully deliver information to Robin. It is evident that Robin and Marian's relationship has grown stronger; however, Marian seems to be in a love triangle with Robin and Guy. Guy is still ignorant of her being Night Watchman, and Robin's informer, and harbours deep feelings for her. However, she remains faithful to Robin. Also in the second series, she discovers several uses for her beauty and her role as a Lady to manipulate Guy's feelings for her. She keeps him believing that he still has a chance to win her heart so she is able to stay close to him and get information to help Robin.

When her father dies, she agrees to join Robin in Sherwood Forest, despite several heated arguments as to whether it is the right thing to do. They eventually decide the most important thing is not their happiness, but keeping Nottingham safe and looked after.

In Lardner's Ring, Episode 9 of the series, Robin proposes to Marian. She accepts his hand and his ring, although by the end of the episode, she is once more back in the castle with Guy. Later on, she hides the ring from Guy, wearing it only in private.

In the final episode of series 2 (We Are Robin Hood!), Marian shields King Richard as Guy advances on the injured King. She admits her relationship with Robin and how she would rather die than be with Guy, to which he responds by attacking her, and stabbing her with his sword. Robin arrives as Guy retreats with the Sheriff. Marian marries Robin while she lies dying. She then dies in her husband's arms and is carried to her grave.

Third series 
Lady Marian returns as a ghost as Robin is dying in the last episode Something Worth Fighting For Part 2.

References

Fictional lords and ladies